The 1972 NASL Final was the championship match of the 1972 season, between the New York Cosmos and the St. Louis Stars.  The match was played on August 26, 1972 at Hofstra Stadium, in Hempstead, New York. The New York Cosmos won the match, 2–1, and were crowned the 1972 NASL champions.

Background

St. Louis Stars
The St. Louis Stars qualified for the playoffs by winning the Southern Division with 69 points. This guaranteed them at least one home playoff game. They defeated the 1970 champions, the Rochester Lancers, 2–0, in a semifinal game played on August 15, 1972 to advance to the final.

New York Cosmos

The New York Cosmos qualified for the playoffs by winning the Northern Division with 77 points. They also had the highest point-total in the NASL, and therefore were guaranteed home field throughout the playoffs. They defeated the defending champion Dallas Tornado, 1–0, in a semifinal game played on August 19, 1972 to advance to the final.

Game summary
The Cosmos took an early lead after league MVP Randy Horton headed winger Roby Young's corner kick off the crossbar and in at 4:23. The lead would be last through the intermission, until Casey Frankiewicz, the Stars' player/coach, tied the game seven minutes after the restart. Frankiewicz's goal was the source of some controversy as referee Roger Schott initially ruled the play offside. Multiple Stars players appealed to linesman Bill Maxwell who ruled the play good. Schott subsequently reversed his decision and allowed the goal to stand.

Late in the rain-soaked game with New York applying pressure, Cosmos' midfielder John Kerr was fouled in the penalty area by St. Louis defender Gary Rensing. Schott promptly awarded New York a penalty, which Josef Jelínek buried at 4:19 from time. Two minutes later with tempers flaring, as St. Louis pressed for the equalizer, Cosmos defender Werner Roth was sent off, leaving New York a man short for the final two minutes of the match. In a furious push at the end, forward Willy Roy found the net for St. Louis with only thirteen second remaining. Like before, Roger Schott again ruled the Stars offside. But unlike the previous occasion, the Stars' appeals to both the referee and linesman fell on deaf ears this time, giving New York the title.

Championship results

1972 NASL Champions: New York Cosmos

Statistics

See also 
 1972 North American Soccer League season

References

External links
 1972 NASL Soccer Bowl (archived, 30 Sep 2013)

1972
 
1972
August 1972 sports events in the United States
1972 in sports in New York (state)
Soccer in New York (state)